The Stranger is the seventh book in the Animorphs series, written by K.A. Applegate. It is narrated by Rachel.

Plot summary
Rachel's father asks her to move with him to another state. After some reconnaissance work, Marco and Tobias find an entrance to the underground Yeerk Pool, in one of the changing rooms at The Gap. The Animorphs decide to infiltrate the pool and to try to find the location of the Earth-based Kandrona by going in as cockroaches. Once inside the complex, however, they get caught on the tongue of a Taxxon. As they are about to be devoured, time freezes and they feel themselves being forcibly brought out of morph. They are rendered human once again, including Tobias. They are then introduced to an all-powerful being called an Ellimist. The Ellimist tells the kids that he cannot interfere with other species, but when species are in danger of becoming extinct, he can step in and save a sample. He informs them that he wants to preserve part of Earth's beauty, along with some humans, because the Yeerks are going to win the war in the future.

The Animorphs ask how much time they have to consider the offer, but the Ellimist tells them that they must decide now. If they choose yes, they and their families would be transported to another planet, but if they choose no, everything would be returned to the way it was before the Ellimist's arrival. The group puts the decision up to a vote, and during the deliberation, Jake and Rachel notice a drop shaft and a human frozen in the act of moving up in it. The Animorphs choose not to accept the Ellimist's offer and are immediately back in cockroach morph on a Taxxon's tongue. They are able to demorph and fight their way to the drop shaft to escape the Yeerk pool.

Later, the Ellimist appears to the group again to give them the choice one more time. To aid their decision, he transports them to a grim future in which the Yeerks have enslaved Earth, the Animorphs encountering the future Visser Three--now Visser One--and an infested older Rachel (although it is hinted that this timeline is actually an alternate future rather than an actual future for the Animorphs' true timeline, as Rachel's Yeerk is confused by the presence of Ax and refers to six humans coming into the future, suggesting that she is from an alternate timeline where Ax was never rescued and/or another person was with the main Animorphs when they walked through the construction site). Rachel notices, with some confusion, that most of the skyscrapers and buildings in the city have been leveled except for the tallest one: the EGS Tower. This tower stood at the base of a large, open Yeerk pool and was covered with a shiny dome.  After they return to their own time, the Animorphs reverse their earlier decision and accept the Ellimist's offer. They expect to be immediately whisked away; however, nothing happens.

Rachel is disconcerted by this and concludes that the Ellimist did not transport them because he wanted a different answer. While thinking on it, she realizes that only because of the Ellimist's first appearance were they able to see the drop shaft and know that there was a chance to escape the Taxxon. She then determines that during the trip to the future, the Ellimist was once again simply trying to show them something that he could not overtly tell them without interfering. She remembers the EGS Tower with the dome, deduces that the Kandrona must be located there, and gathers the rest of the Animorphs for a raid.

After a vicious battle just before dawn, the Animorphs manage to take the top floor of the tower and destroy the Kandrona by shoving it out of the window. The Ellimist speaks to them again, and confirms Rachel's suspicion that even he cannot tell the future, and humans might win the war yet. Rachel tells her father she cannot move with him.

Morphs

TV adaptation
The Stranger was loosely adapted as part of the Animorphs TV series, which aired on Nickelodeon and YTV. Most elements are found in the twelfth episode, "The Stranger", with others in the fourteenth and fifteenth episodes, "The Leader", a two part story. 

In the book series, the Animorphs rarely acquired morphs if they did not have a specific use for them. In the TV series, Cassie encourages this behavior, acquiring whenever they can.
Ax is captured by several Controllers with rope lassos; it is clearly established in the book series that it is nearly impossible to sneak up on an Andalite from behind. Ax would also be able to quickly cut through the ropes and escape his captors.
In the TV series, the Animorphs meet the Ellimist when they are captured by Yeerks in the forest, as they search for Ax. In the book series, the Animorphs were infiltrating the Yeerk Pool as cockroaches when they were suddenly swallowed by a Taxxon and about to be digested. Allowing Rachel to notice a human-Controller flying up a drop shaft is the Ellimist's subtle interference, allowing the Animorphs to escape the Yeerk Pool once they burst from the Taxxon's stomach. The Ellimist shows the kids the future so that they may deduce the location of the Kandrona, atop the EGS tower; in the TV series, the point of showing them a Yeerk-controlled future is so that Rachel may bring a knife back to their reality, allowing them to escape the Yeerks' net trap. The Animorphs discover the location of the Kandrona by overhearing a telephone conversation between Tom and another Controller regarding the new Kandrona's installation.
The Kandrona in the TV series, unlike that in the books, emits a visible red light ray.
The only non-Andalite to morph in "The Stranger" is Rachel, into a lion; the attack on the Kandrona that was a key plot point of the book occurs in "The Leader (Part 1)". Cassie and Rachel are left to destroy the device, while Jake and Marco are aboard the Pool Ship, a plot line from The Predator.

Re-release
Scholastic has re-released this book with a lenticular cover in June 2012.

Animorphs books
1997 science fiction novels
1997 American novels
Novels about time travel